Boraston is a civil parish and a village in Shropshire, England.  It contains eleven listed buildings that are recorded in the National Heritage List for England.  Of these, two are listed at Grade II*, the middle of the three grades, and the others are at Grade II, the lowest grade.  All the listed buildings are in the village, and they include a church, houses, farmhouses and farm buildings, and a telephone kiosk.  Many of the buildings date from the 16th and 17th centuries and they are basically timber framed.

Key

Buildings

References

Citations

Sources

Lists of buildings and structures in Shropshire